Activation syndrome is a form of stimulation (sometimes suicidal) or agitation that has been observed in association with some psychoactive drugs. A causative role has not been established.   Pfizer has denied that sertraline can cause such effects.

Treatment
Serotonin reuptake inhibitors (SSRI) have been associated with a state of restlessness, lability, agitation, and anxiety termed "activation syndrome". In some people, this state change can increase suicidal tendencies, especially in those under age 25 and during the initial weeks of treatment. SSRI-induced activation syndrome is well-accepted by clinicians.
Evidence reveal that jitteriness/anxiety syndrome predicts an improved prognosis (level D).
Activation syndrome resolves within hours of discontinuing the serotonergic agent and initiating care. However, resolution of symptoms may be slightly longer in those taking medications with longer half-lives, such as monoamine oxidase inhibitors (MAOIs).

References

Syndromes
Substance-related disorders